William P. Henszey (December 24, 1832 – March 23, 1909) was an American industrialist, partner and Chief Engineer of the Baldwin Locomotive Works. He was a notable designer of locomotive engines.

Career at Baldwin
Henszey joined Baldwin in 1859 as a draftsman, served as an engine designer and as Chief Engineer, and became a partner in 1870.  He eventually owned a 20% share in the firm.  Because his ownership share was so large, at his death the other partners decided to reorganize the firm as a joint stock company.

Childhood and personal life
Henszey as born in Philadelphia. He married in 1857 to Anna B. Hitchcock.

Wynnewood mansion

Henszey's mansion, Red Leaf, on 6 acres in Wynnewood, Pennsylvania, designed by Furness & Evans, was his family home from 1881 until his death in 1909. The original manor house burned in the 1890s, and was replaced with a home in Tudor Revival style about 1900.  The mansion was converted into apartments in 1946.

References

Baldwin locomotives
American railroad mechanical engineers
American mechanical engineers
American people in rail transportation
Locomotive builders and designers
19th-century American engineers